Minturn may refer to:

Geographical locations

 Minturn, Arkansas
 Minturn, California
 Minturn, Colorado
 Minturn, Maine
 Minturn, South Carolina

People
 Edith Minturn Stokes (1867-1937), American philanthropist, artistic muse and socialite during the Gilded Age.
 Robert Bowne Minturn (1805-1866), American merchant.
 Robert Bowne Minturn, Jr. (1836–1889), American shipping magnate.

Other
 Grinnell, Minturn & Co., 19th-century shipping company

See also
 Minturno